The Warner Scarab Junior was an American, five-cylinder, air-cooled, radial aero engine first produced in 1930. It was a scaled-down derivative of the seven-cylinder Warner Scarab, developing 90 hp (70 kW) against the Scarab's 110 hp (80 kW).

Applications
 Aeronca L
 Culver Dart
 Rearwin Sportster

Specifications (Warner Scarab Junior 50)

See also

References

 Gunston, Bill. (1986). World Encyclopaedia of Aero Engines. Patrick Stephens: Wellingborough. p. 169
 Oldengine.org - US Aero engines page

1930s aircraft piston engines
Aircraft air-cooled radial piston engines